"I Want to Be Gay" is the fourth single released by singer and comedian Julie Brown. It was released 18 years after her last single. The single was originally released on Compact Disc only in a cardboard sleeve and made available exclusively through her website, or through eBay (via her own sales representative). As of 2008, it is available on iTunes and other digital music retailers as a digital download.  The title track is a cheeky pop song about how Brown wishes she were a gay man because (based on stereotype) it would be easier to get laid. It features a dance remix of the song and a new, previously unreleased dance remix of her hit "The Homecoming Queen's Got a Gun".

The single was originally not tied to a full-length album, but was later included on her 2011 album Smell the Glamour. There was no music video released. The cover art features an outtake photo from the session used to create the cover to her single "Girl Fight Tonight!".

References

2005 singles
Julie Brown songs
2005 songs
LGBT-related songs